Myra fugax is a species of crabs in the family Leucosiidae.

Description
Carapace is rounded, globose, with a finely granulate dorsal surface. Chelipeds and legs are long and slender. The color varies from pale pink to pale yellow.

The barnacles of the species Sacculina captiva are parasitic castrators of these crabs.

Distribution
This species is present in the Pacific Ocean, the Mediterranean Sea, the Red Sea and the Indian Ocean. It is common along the coast of New Caledonia, Israel, South Africa, Egypt, Vietnam, Mozambique, Sri Lanka, India, Mauritius and Fiji.

Habitat
This species is typical of sandy substrates, at depths of 9 to 50 m.

Bibliography
 B.S. Galil, A revision of Myra Leach, 1817 (Crustacea: Decapoda: Leucosioidea) (PDF), in Zool. Med, vol. 75, nº 24, Leiden, pp. 409–446, ISSN 0024-0672.
 P. J. F. Davie, Zoological Catalogue of Australia, CSIRO publishing & Australian Biological Resources Study.
 Rupert Riedl, Fauna e flora del Mediterraneo, Franco Muzzio editore, 1983, .
Türkay, M. (2001). Decapoda, in: Costello, M.J. et al. (Ed.) (2001). European register of marine species: a check-list of the marine species in Europe and a bibliography of guides to their identification. Collection Patrimoines Naturels, 50: pp. 284–292

References

External links
 Crustaceology
  Leechitse

Crabs
Crustaceans described in 1783